List of bisexual people including famous people who identify as bisexual and deceased people who have been identified as bisexual.

T

U

V

W

Y

Z

References

T
Lists of LGBT-related people
people T